The Hotel Indigo Hong Kong Island is the newest addition to the Hotel Indigo chain of boutique hotels, part of the InterContinental Hotels Group, which is promoted as being "the industry's first branded boutique hotel experience".

Features
This hotel has 29 floors, with 138 rooms and 6 suites. It is situated on the original coastline of the Queen's Road East in Wan Chai. 

The hotel has a glass-bottomed rooftop infinity pool adjacent to the Skybar. There is a restaurant on the second floor called the Cafe Post. 

The hotel is unique in that it uses the shading effect of neighbouring buildings to create a pattern of sun and shade, which result is the image of a dragon folded around the exterior of the building. The hotel is designed by Aedas.

Awards
The hotel received the Asia Pacific Property Award in 2013 for Best Hotel Architecture, Hong Kong.

References

Hotel buildings completed in 2013
Hotels in Hong Kong
Aedas buildings
Neomodern architecture